An agent of record (AOR) is an individual or a legal entity with a duly executed contractual agreement with an insurance policy owner, in line with the prevailing legal norms and regulations of the region in which the contract was entered. The agent of record has a legal right to receive commissions from the respective insurance policy.

The individual or legal entity is authorized to represent an insured party in purchasing, servicing, and maintaining insurance coverage with a designated insurer. The majority of insurance companies will not disclose information or discuss an insured party's account with an agent other than the agent of record. An insured party wishing to change insurance agent(s) must submit a revised agent of record letter to the respective insurer authorizing said insurer to release the insured party's information and to discuss the insured party's coverage with the newly appointed agent.

Relevant documents may be executed via hard copy documents or, alternatively, electronically in jurisdictions where electronic execution is legal. Applications may be made electronically, as well as in physical form.

An agent of record letter can, in some cases, be used as an insurance sales tool, though some question its legality.

See also
Insurance law
Principle of legality

References

Insurance law
Legal doctrines and principles